Jaime Cardozo Tahua (born March 14, 1982 in Beni) is a Bolivian retired footballer.

Club career
He played for Aurora, The Strongest, Jorge Wilstermann and Nacional Potosí in the Bolivian league.

International career
Cardozo earned 3 caps for Bolivia and represented his country in 1 FIFA World Cup qualification match.

References

External links 
 
 
 

1982 births
Living people
People from Beni Department
Association football wingers
Bolivian footballers
Bolivia international footballers
The Strongest players
Club Aurora players
C.D. Jorge Wilstermann players
Nacional Potosí players